County Route 515 (CR 515) is a county highway in the U.S. state of New Jersey. The highway extends  from Route 23 in Hardyston Township to the New York state line in Vernon Township. Between Route 23 and Route 94, this highway is known as Vernon-Stockholm Road. It then splits off and is also known as Prices Switch Road. It then ends at the New York state line, where it continues as a local road.

Route description

CR 515 begins at an intersection with Route 23 in Hardyston Township, heading to the north on two-lane undivided Vernon Road. The road crosses over the New York, Susquehanna and Western Railway's New Jersey Subdivision line and the Pequannock River as it passes a few homes before continuing into forested areas of mountains. The road continues into Vernon Township, continuing through rural areas with a few clusters of residential neighborhoods. The road intersects CR 638 as homes on the road become more constant along with a few businesses.

CR 515 comes to an intersection with Route 94, at which point it forms a concurrency with that route. The two routes continue northeast on Vernon Warwick Road, passing more wooded areas of development before running near farms. After crossing the Appalachian Trail, CR 515 splits from Route 94 by heading north on Prices Switch Road. The road crosses the New York, Susquehanna and Western Railway again as it continues through a mix of farmland and woodland with some residences. CR 515 ends at the New York state line, with Prices Switch Road continuing into that state as a local road.

Major intersections

See also

References

External links 

NJ State Highways: CR 515-530

515
515